Suhorje is a village in the hills southwest of Pivka in the Inner Carniola region of Slovenia.

The local parish church, built outside the settlement to the south, is dedicated to Saint Nicholas and belongs to the Koper Diocese.

References

External links
Suhorje on Geopedia

Populated places in the Municipality of Pivka